Tymko (Tomasz) Padura, also Padurra, (21 December 1801 – 20 September 1871) was a Polish Romantic poet of the so-called Ukrainian school, musician-torbanist, and composer-songwriter. He was born into patriotic Polish noble family. 

Padura's ballad of Ustym Karmaliuk "Beyond Siberia The Sun Rises" ("За Сибіром cонце cходить") achieved extraordinary popularity in 19th century Ukraine. It became a folk-song. He may also have written the song "Hej Sokoły", which is very popular in both Ukraine and Poland.

He was born in Illintsi and died in Koziatyn (then in the Russian Empire, now in Ukraine). He participated in the November Uprising.

References

See also

1801 births
1871 deaths
19th-century classical composers
19th-century male musicians
19th-century Polish male writers
19th-century Polish poets
19th-century Ukrainian poets
Composers for lute
Composers for torban
Historicist composers
Kobzarstvo
Polish lutenists
Polish male classical composers
Polish male poets
Polish Romantic composers
Romantic poets
Torbanists
Ukrainian classical composers
Ukrainian male poets